Jonathan Morris (born in Taunton, England), is an author who writes various kinds of Doctor Who spin-off material.

Career

Writing

His path to prominence in writing professional Doctor Who fiction was notable in part because he was commissioned to write a novel after only his first attempt under the
BBC's "Open Submission" policy.

He has written for the Eighth Doctor Adventures and Past Doctor Adventures. He has also written for Big Finish Productions' range of audio and printed material. Among
his Doctor Who literary credits are short stories in the Big Finish Short Trips anthologies; the novels Festival of Death, Anachrophobia,
and The Tomorrow Windows; and the audio adventures Bloodtide, Flip-Flop, Max Warp,
The Haunting of Thomas Brewster, A Perfect World, Mary's Story, Hothouse,
The Cannibalists, The Eternal Summer, Protect and Survive and 1963: The Space Race. Festival of Death
received 2000's "Best Past Doctor Novel" award from the readers of Doctor Who Magazine. Morris contributed "The Clanging Chimes of Doom" to
Short Trips: A Christmas Treasury, "Lant Land" to Short Trips: Life Science, "The Thief of Sherwood" to Short Trips: Past Tense, and "Mauritz" to
Short Trips: A Universe of Terrors. His debut novel, Festival of Death, was placed seventh in the Top 10 of SFX magazine's "Best SF/Fantasy novelisation
or TV tie-in novel" category of 2000.

In 2005, he wrote the narration script for the documentary "Paris in the Springtime", a homage to Douglas Adams' work on Doctor Who, which was included in the BBC DVD
release of the serial City of Death.

In addition to his Doctor Who work, he has also written for Big Finish's Judge Dredd range, contributing the title, I Love Judge Dredd.
For the Bernice Summerfield series of anthologies he has contributed the short stories "The Spartacus Syndrome" (in A Life of Surprises) and "The Traitors" (in
Life During Wartime). In 2011, he contributed to their Dark Shadows range with The Blind Painter
and Operation Victor.

In 2005, some of his writing was included in the televised British sketch/situation comedy fusion, Swinging.

Bibliography

Novels
 Festival of Death (2000)
 Anachrophobia (2002)
 The Tomorrow Windows (2004)
 Touched by an Angel (2011)

Short Stories
 Mauritz
 The Thief of Sherwood
 Lantland
 The Clanging Chimes of Doom
 Bernice Summerfield: The Traitors
 Bernice Summerfield: The Spartacus Syndrome

Audio Productions

Big Finish: Doctor Who
 Bloodtide (2001)
 Flip-Flop (2003)
 The Haunting of Thomas Brewster (2008)
 A Perfect World (2008)
 Mary's Story (2009)
 The Eternal Summer (2009)
 Cobwebs (2010)
 The Crimes of Thomas Brewster (2011)
 The Curse of Davros (2012)
 Protect and Survive (2012)
 The Shadow Heart (2012)
 Prisoners of Fate (2013)
 1963: The Space Race (2013)
 Revenge of the Swarm (2014)
 The Entropy Plague (2015)
 We Are the Daleks (2015)
 The Waters of Amsterdam (2016)
 Vortex Ice (2017)
 Static (2017)
 The Kamelion Empire (2019)
 Lightspeed (2020)

Big Finish: Companion Chronicles
 The Beautiful People (2007)
 The Great Space Elevator (2008)
 The Glorious Revolution (2009)
 The Mists of Time (2009)
 Tales from the Vault (2011)
 Mastermind (2013)
 Ghost in the Machine (2013)

Big Finish: Eighth Doctor Adventures
 Max Warp (2008)
 Hothouse (2009)
 The Cannibalists (2009)
 Deimos (2010)
 The Resurrection of Mars (2010)

Big Finish: Fourth Doctor Adventures
 The Auntie Matter (2013)
 Phantoms of the Deep (2013)
 Last of the Colophon (2014)
 The Cloisters of Terror (2015)
 The Paradox Planet (2016)
 Legacy of Death (2016)
 Subterranea (2017)
 Chase the Night (2020)
 The Day of the Comet (2021)

Big Finish: Jago & Lightfoot
 The Spirit Trap (2010)
 The Theatre of Dreams (2011)
 The Age of Revolution (2013)
 The Skeleton Quay (2013)
 The Monstrous Menagerie (2014)
 The Flying Frenchmen (2015)
 The Year of the Bat (2015)

Big Finish: The Lost Stories
 The Valley of Death (2011; story by Philip Hinchcliffe)
 The Guardians of Prophecy (2012; story by Johnny Byrne)
 Doctor Who and The Ark (2023; story by John Lucarotti)

Other Doctor Who Big Finish stories
 Voyage to Venus (2012)
 Psychodrome (2014)
 The Screaming Skull (2014)
 Damaged Goods (2016; story by Russell T Davies)
 The Lords of Terror (2018)
 The Crash of the UK-201 (2018)
 The Avenues of Possibility (2019)
 Ghosts (2020)
 Genetics of the Daleks (2020)
 Saviour (2021)
 Maelstrom (2022)
 Emancipation of the Daleks (2022)

Big Finish: Vienna
 The Memory Box (2013)
 Death World (2013)
 The Vienna Experience (2015)

Big Finish: Torchwood
 Instant Karma (2018; with David Llewellyn and James Goss)

Big Finish: The Diary of River Song
 The Bekdel Test (2019)
 Queen of the Mechonoids (2021)

Big Finish: Missy
 The Belly of the Beast (2019)

Big Finish: UNIT
 This Sleep of Death (2019)

Big Finish: The Paternoster Gang
 The Cars That Ate London! (2019)

Big Finish: Rose Tyler
 The Endless Night (2019)

Big Finish: 2000 AD
 I Love Judge Dredd (2002)

Big Finish: Dark Shadows
 The Blind Painter (2011)
 Operation Victor (2012)

Big Finish: Survivors
 Exodus (2014)
 Cabin Fever (2015)

BBC Audio: Destiny Of The Doctor
 Babblesphere (2013)

References

External links
 
 
Read fan reviews of his Doctor Who work

1973 births
Living people
21st-century English novelists
21st-century British short story writers
21st-century English male writers
English science fiction writers
English dramatists and playwrights
English male dramatists and playwrights
English male short story writers
English short story writers
English male novelists
Writers of Doctor Who novels